Platydoris dierythros is a species of sea slug, a dorid nudibranch, shell-less marine opisthobranch gastropod mollusks in the family Discodorididae.

Distribution
This species was described from NW Australia and Northern Territory, Australia.

References

Discodorididae
Gastropods described in 2003
Gastropods
Gastropods of Australia